Het Sas is a hamlet in the municipality Alphen-Chaam in the Dutch province of North Brabant. It is located southwest of Alphen.

Het Sas is not a statistical entity, and the postal authorities have placed it under Alphen. It was first mentioned in 1838 as Het Sas, and means sluice in the river Leije. The hamlet consists of about 15 houses.

References 

Populated places in North Brabant
Alphen-Chaam